Janvier Hadi (born 15 January 1991) is a Rwandan former cyclist, who rode professionally for the  and  teams. He also represented Rwanda at the 2014 Commonwealth Games in Glasgow.

Major results

2012
 7th Team time trial, African Road Championships
 9th Overall Kwita Izina Cycling Tour
2013
 1st Prologue Tour du Rwanda
 African Road Championships
3rd  Under-23 road race
5th Road race
10th Time trial
2014
 1st Prologue Tour du Rwanda
 2nd Road race, National Road Championships
2015
 African Games
1st  Road race
3rd  Team time trial
8th Time trial
 1st Grand Prix d'Oran
 Tour d'Annaba
1st Mountains classification
1st Stage 4
 2nd Overall Tour de Côte d'Ivoire
 4th Team time trial, African Road Championships
 6th Grand Prix de Khouribga, Challenge des phosphates
 9th Overall Tour de Blida

References

External links

1991 births
Living people
Rwandan male cyclists
African Games gold medalists for Rwanda
African Games medalists in cycling
African Games bronze medalists for Rwanda
Competitors at the 2015 African Games
Cyclists at the 2014 Commonwealth Games
Commonwealth Games competitors for Rwanda